Kula Gowravam  is a 1972 Telugu-language drama film produced by N. Trivikrama Rao under the Ramakrishna Cine Studios and N.A.T. Combines banner and directed by Peketi Sivaram with the supervision by N. T. Rama Rao. It stars N. T. Rama Rao, Jayanthi, Aarathi  with music composed by T. G. Lingappa. The film is a remake of director's own 1971 Kannada film Kula Gourava.

Plot
Zamindar Raja Ramachandra Bahadur (N. T. Rama Rao) gives priority to the family prestige and self-esteem. At the same time, he is well known for the charities, his son Raghunatha Prasad (again N. T. Rama Rao) a strong believer in patriotism. Once, he gets the acquaintance with a dancer, Seeta (Jayanthi) and falls in love with her. But Ramachandra Bahadur objects their marriage, so, Raghu leaves the house and marries her. Time passes, the couple is blessed with a baby boy, Shankar. At that point in time, Ramachandra Bahadur is depressed for his son and grandson. Looking at it, the Diwan makes a crooked plan by which Raghu suspects Seeta and leaves the house taking his son. Heartbroken Seeta decides to prove her chastity. Raghu changes his name starts working as a laborer and educates his son. Parallelly Seeta, who is in search of her husband faints up in a train when a contractor saves her. He requests her to stay along with them and Seeta becomes governess to his daughter Radha. Years roll by, Shankar (once again N. T. Rama Rao) becomes a doctor and works at a medical college. Radha (Aarthi) also studies in the same college and they love each other. There, Raja Ramachandra Bahadur becomes sick and mentally upset. Once, when Seeta gets sick, Radha calls Shankar when he recognizes his mother. But he does not want to meet her until his father approves. Rest of the story is how Shankar reunites his parents and teaches a lesson to his grandfather.

Cast
N. T. Rama Rao as Raja Ramachandra Prasad, Raghunath Prasad & Shankar (Triple role)
Jayanthi as Seeta
Aarathi as Radha
V. Nagayya
Padmanabham
Raavi Kondala Rao 
Mada
Chalapathi Rao
Sarathi
Sandhya Rani
Ramadevi

Soundtrack

Music composed by  T. G. Lingappa.

References

Indian drama films
Telugu remakes of Kannada films
Films scored by T. G. Lingappa